Hans-Bernd Schäfer (born 25 May 1943 in Münster, Germany) is a German economist and a pioneer in the field of law and economics in Germany and Europe.

Schäfer is professor emeritus at the University of Hamburg and former director of the Institute of Law & Economics. Currently he is an affiliate professor at Bucerius Law School in Hamburg, Germany. He has been visiting professor at various universities abroad, including the University of Toronto Faculty of Law, Tel Aviv University faculty of law, George Mason University School of Law (distinguished visiting professor from 2002–2009), and the Indira Gandhi Institute of Development Research. He was a visiting scholar at the University of California, Berkeley, School of Law.

Schäfer served as President of the European Association of Law & Economics from 2004–2007 and was Director of the European Master Programme in Law & Economics from 2004–2008.

In 2012 the faculty of law of the Universidad de San Martín de Porres in Lima awarded him the title of an honorary professor, whilst in 2013 he was awarded the scholar prize of the European Association of Law and Economics. The Latin American and Iberian Law and Economics Association awarded him the scholar prize in 2016. He was appointed to an honorary membership of the Polish Law and Economics Association in 2013 and of the German Law and Economics Association in the year 2016.

Research and publications
Professor Schäfer has published extensively in the field of law and economics, development economics, as well as institutional economics. Recent publications include the book "Solomon’s Knot: How Law Can End the Poverty of Nations" together with Robert Cooter. His textbook "The Economic Analysis of Civil Law" (co-authored with Claus Ott) is broadly considered to be the leading textbook on the economic analysis of civil law in Germany and has been translated into German (original version), Spanish and Chinese.

 Hans-Bernd Schäfer and Robert D. Cooter. Solomon's Knot: How Law Can End the Poverty of Nations. Princeton University Press, 2012.
 Hans-Bernd Schäfer and Claus Ott. The Economic Analysis of Civil Law. Edward Elgar, London 2004.
 Hans-Bernd Schäfer and Hein Kötz. Judex oeconomicus. 12 höchstrichterliche Entscheidungen, kommentiert aus ökonomischer Sicht. Mohr Siebeck, Tübingen 2003.

Education
 Diplom-Volkswirt, University of Cologne (1967)
 Dr. disc. oec., University of Bochum (1970)

External links
 
 Institute of Law & Economics
 European Master Programme in Law & Economics
 European Association of Law & Economics

1943 births
German economists
Living people
Law and economics scholars
Academic staff of Bilkent University
Academic staff of the University of Hamburg